Michael Krauss may refer to:

 Michael A. Krauss (born 1939), American television producer
 Michael E. Krauss (1934–2019), American linguist
 Michael I. Krauss (born 1951), American law professor

See also
Michael Kraus (disambiguation)